The 1984 New Zealand bravery awards were announced via a Special Honours List on 13 December 1984, and recognised ten people for acts of bravery between 1982 and 1984.

Queen's Commendation for Brave Conduct
 Jape Sargent Wanoa – traffic officer, Ministry of Transport, Dunedin.

 Bruce John McMillan – fireman, Feilding Volunteer Fire Brigade, New Zealand Fire Service.

 Ronald MacGregor Renz – inspector, New Zealand Police, Auckland.
 Jeffrey Gary Gerbich – traffic sergeant, Auckland City Council.
 Christopher John England – traffic officer, Auckland City Council.

 Private Michael John Thomas Tristram – Royal New Zealand Infantry Regiment.
 Private David Thomas Upton – Royal New Zealand Infantry Regiment.

 Robert Wayne Thompson – traffic sergeant, Auckland Motorways, Ministry of Transport, Auckland.

 David Albert Sullivan – of Auckland.

 Robert Edgar Brocas – traffic officer, Ministry of Transport, Meremere.

References

Bravery
Bravery awards
New Zealand bravery awards